Bolonia may refer to:

Bologna, a city in Italy 
Bolonia, Spain, a small town in Andalusia